Regina Maria (F222) is a Type 22 frigate of the Romanian Naval Forces, formerly a Royal Navy ship named HMS London (F95). It is named after Queen Marie of Romania, wife of King Ferdinand I of Romania.

Service
HMS London was a Type 22 frigate of the Royal Navy, originally named Bloodhound but renamed London at the request of the Lord Mayor of London.

She was flagship of the Royal Navy task force during the 1991 Gulf War.

She was decommissioned on 14 January 1999 and sold to the Romanian Navy on 14 January 2003, being commissioned as Regina Maria on 21 April 2005. Before the sale the Sea Wolf and Exocet missile systems were removed, and the only armament the ship had when delivered was two 30 mm BMARC cannons and two three-tube anti-submarine torpedo launchers. The Romanian Navy had a 76 mm OTO-Melara gun system fitted forward where the Exocets had been mounted, but no missile systems or additional weapons have been fitted.  There has since been some controversy over the price for which Romania purchased the ship.

Commanding officers

Gallery

See also
NMS Regina Maria (Regele Ferdinand-class destroyer), a World War II-era namesake

References

Publications

 

1984 ships
Type 22 frigates of the Royal Navy
Gulf War ships of the United Kingdom
Type 22 frigates of the Romanian Naval Forces